The 1947–48 Scottish League Cup was the second staging of Scotland's second football knockout competition. The competition was won by East Fife, who defeated Falkirk in the Final.

First round

Group 1

Group 2

Group 3

Group 4

Group 5

Group 6

Group 7

Group 8

Quarter-finals

Semi-finals

Final

Replay

References

General

Specific

Scottish League Cup seasons
League Cup, 1947-48